The Beurs van Berlage is a building on the Damrak, in the centre of Amsterdam. It was designed as a commodity exchange by architect Hendrik Petrus Berlage and constructed between 1896 and 1903.  It influenced many modernist architects, in particular functionalists and the Amsterdam School.  It is now used as a venue for concerts, exhibitions and conferences.

The building is constructed of red brick, with an iron and glass roof, and stone piers, lintels and corbels.

The aim of the architect was to modify the styles of the past by emphasizing sweeping planes and open plan interiors. It has stylistic similarities with some earlier buildings, for instance St Pancras station and the work of H. H. Richardson in America, or the Castell dels Tres Dragons, Barcelona, by Lluís Domènech i Montaner.  True to its nineteenth-century roots, it maintains the use of ornament in a civic structure.

On 2 February 2002 the civil ceremony of the wedding of King Willem-Alexander and Máxima Zorreguieta took place in the Beurs van Berlage.

The Beurs van Berlage has a café located on the Beursplein side and the tower is also open to the public.

Further reading

External links 
 
 Beurs van Berlage Tower Panorama – AmsterdamTips.com
 Netherlands, Amsterdam, Damrak - Beurs van Berlage, VR panoramas by Tolomeus

Bell towers in the Netherlands
Rijksmonuments in Amsterdam
Commercial buildings completed in 1903
Concert halls in Amsterdam
Art Nouveau architecture in Amsterdam
Art Nouveau commercial buildings
Former stock exchanges in the Netherlands
Towers in Amsterdam